"Genius of Love" is a 1981 hit song by Tom Tom Club from their 1981 eponymous debut album.  It reached number one on the Billboard Disco Top 80 chart.

Background
"Genius of Love" is Tom Tom Club's second single. Although the album had not been released in North America, over 100,000 copies of the single sold as imports from Island Records UK, at which point Sire Records made a deal to release the single and the album in North America in late 1981.

Tina Weymouth sings the lead and also co-wrote the song: although she was responsible for writing the bassline and intended to play it on record, she was forced to pass on the latter task to another musician. As she related in a 1997 interview with Bassplayer.com, "we were given extremely limited studio time – just three days – and when it was time to do that track my whole right arm seized up in a terrible cramp, and I couldn't play. I had never played in the studio around the clock like we were doing, so I didn't even know that could happen. I ended up waking the assistant engineer - he was asleep under the console - and I showed him the part, and he played it. Chris (Frantz) was mad, but I really couldn't play; my hand wouldn't even close. So we did what we had to do. These things happen."

The lyrics also pay tribute to many notable black musicians and singers, including George Clinton, Bootsy Collins, Smokey Robinson, Bob Marley, Sly and Robbie, Kurtis Blow, Hamilton Bohannon, and James Brown.

Frantz and Weymouth performed the song as Tom Tom Club in the 1984 Talking Heads concert movie Stop Making Sense, as an interlude to allow Talking Heads frontman David Byrne to change into costume for the film's performance of "Girlfriend is Better".

Chart performance
"Genius of Love" became a commercial success that performed better than Tom Tom Club's previous singles. Chris Frantz credited the success of the single for convincing David Byrne to "soldier on with Talking Heads". On its release in November 1981, "Genius of Love" became a huge hit in the clubs and on the R&B and dance charts worldwide, soon earning the Tom Tom Club LP a Gold Sales Award in 1982. In the U.S., the song reached No. 1 on the Billboard Disco Top 80 chart along with "Wordy Rappinghood", and also reached No. 2 on the Hot Soul Singles chart. It later went on to peak at No. 31 on the Billboard Hot 100 in April 1982, becoming Tom Tom Club's only entry on the Hot 100.

"Genius of Love" reached No. 65 on the UK Singles Chart, while both of the other two singles released from the Tom Tom Club LP achieved top 30 placings in the UK. A song based on the keyboards-and-bass rhythm in "Genius of Love" was later used in a long-running TV advertising campaign in the UK by the Bird's desserts company between 1985 and 1992, the commercials featuring a spin on the psychedelic animation of the Tom Tom Club video using rudimentary CGI. In 2002, it was also used in a popular TV commercial for Kia Motors.

The single also became a club success all around Europe, and peaked at number 28 in New Zealand, the first of three top 40 hits for the band there.

Music video

The official hand-drawn crayon and colored pencil animated music video for "Genius of Love" was produced by the band along with Cucumber Studios Ltd.

Personnel
Tina Weymouth – vocals, bass
Chris Frantz – vocals, drum machine
Adrian Belew – guitar
Tyrone Downie – synthesizers
Uziah "Sticky" Thompson – percussion
Laura Weymouth – backing vocals
Lani Weymouth – backing vocals, spoken words in gibberish (mixture of English, Korean and Japanese)

Singles
 "Genius of Love" / "Lorelei" (Instrumental) UK, 1981 (7"/12")
 "Genius of Love" / "Lorelei" (Instrumental) Netherlands, 1981 (7"/12")
 "Genius of Love" / "Lorelei" (Instrumental) Germany, 1981 (7")
 "Genius of Love" / "Lorelei" (Instrumental) United States, 1981 (7"/12")

Charts

Samples
The song is one of the most sampled rhythm tracks of the 1980s, particularly within the hip hop and R&B genre. Notable versions include Dr. Jeckyl & Mr. Hyde's "Genius Rap" in 1981; Grandmaster Flash and the Furious Five's "It's Nasty" in 1982; Mariah Carey's "Fantasy" in 1995, The X-Ecutioners' "Genius of Love 2002" in 2002, and Latto's "Big Energy" in 2021.

Other artists have incorporated "Genius of Love" into their works, including Public Enemy's "Leave This Off Your Fuckin' Charts", X Clan’s “In The Ways of the Scales”, Redman's "Brick City Mashin'", Cam'ron's "Me, My Moms & Jimmy", 2nd II None's "Niggaz Trippin'", Fresh Kid Ice's "Roll Call", 2Pac's "High Speed", Seagram's "I Don't Give a Fuck", Busta Rhymes' "One", Ant Banks' "Roll 'Em Phat", P.M. Dawn's "Gotta Be... Movin' On Up", Menajahtwa's "I Ain't Nasti", 50 Cent's "When I Get Out", Erick Sermon's "Genius E Dub", Mac Dre's "Chop that Ho", Dream Warriors' "And Now the Legacy Begins", T.I.'s "Down Like That", R.A. the Rugged Man's "Tom Thum", Mark Morrison's "Return of the Mack", Ice Cube's "Bop Gun (One Nation)", WC and the Maad Circle's "Curb Servin'", Warren G's "What's Love Got to Do with It", the D-Influence Real Live Mix of Billie's "Girlfriend", and Paramore's "Rose-Colored Boy", during their shows at the After Laughter Tour.

In other media
The song's musical bridge, which contains a repeated chant of "Bohannon", was one of several theme songs used for many years by a syndicated U.S. talk radio program hosted by Jim Bohannon. However, the chant was a reference to record producer and disco pioneer Hamilton Bohannon.

References

External links
 Official Discography by Tom Tom Club
 [ Review] on AllMusic
Song Page at WhoSampled

1980 songs
1981 singles
Animated music videos
Tom Tom Club songs
Songs written by Adrian Belew
Songs written by Chris Frantz
Songs written by Tina Weymouth
Songs written by Steven Stanley
Post-disco songs
Music videos directed by Annabel Jankel
Music videos directed by Rocky Morton
Sire Records singles
Warner Records singles
Funk songs